Bidhushekhar Shastri (1878–1957) was a Bengali Sanskrit scholar, editor and linguist.

Early life
Shastri was born at Harishchandrapur, Maldah in British India. He studied at a Tol, after receiving Kavyatirtha degree he went to Benaras for higher studies. Shastri became expert in Sanskrit language and wrote prose and poetry. He received the title Shastri from Benaras after completion of study. Initially he worked in Metropolitan Bohubazar Branch School in Kolkata, In 1905, he started his career as a Sanskrit professor in Brahmacharya Vidyalay at Santiniketan, became the principal of Vidya Bhawan, founded by Rabindranath. Then Shastri joined in the Calcutta University as Asutosh Professor. He had knowledge about Vedic literature, French, German, Tibetan and Chinese languages.

Works
Shastri worked for recovering lost Sanskrit texts from Tibetan translations as well as tried to revive old Sanskrit Tols to make them relevant in contemporary society. He edited 17 books in Bengali and English on a number of subjects like Logic, Philosophy, Pali, History of Buddhism etc. Shastri received D.Litt from the Calcutta University and Deshikottama from the Visva Bharati University. In 1936 he was awarded with the title of Mahamahopadhyaya by the Government of India.

References

1878 births
1957 deaths
Bengali Hindus
Bengali writers
20th-century Bengalis
19th-century Bengalis
Sanskrit writers
Indian Sanskrit scholars
Indian scholars
Indian academics
Indian writers
Indian male writers
Indian editors
Indian scholars of Buddhism
19th-century Indian linguists
20th-century Indian linguists
20th-century Indian writers
19th-century Indian writers
20th-century Indian male writers
19th-century Indian male writers
20th-century Indian scholars
19th-century Indian scholars
People from Malda district
Academic staff of Visva-Bharati University
Academic staff of the University of Calcutta
Scholars from Kolkata
West Bengal academics
Writers in British India